Tuberculanostoma  is a genus of hoverflies.

Species
T. antennatum Fluke, 1943

References

Diptera of South America
Syrphinae
Hoverfly genera